In mathematics, the Riemann–Liouville integral associates with a real function  another function  of the same kind for each value of the parameter . The Riemann–Liouville integral is named for Bernhard Riemann and Joseph Liouville, the latter of whom was the first to consider the possibility of fractional calculus in 1832. The operator agrees with the Euler transform, after Leonhard Euler, when applied to analytic functions. It was generalized to arbitrary dimensions by Marcel Riesz, who introduced the Riesz potential.

Definition
The Riemann–Liouville integral is defined by

The dependence on the base-point  is often suppressed, and represents a freedom in constant of integration. Another notation, which emphasizes the base point, is

The fundamental relations hold

the latter of which is a semigroup property.

Properties
Fix a bounded interval . Thus  defines a linear operator on :

Fubini's theorem also shows that this operator is continuous with respect to the Banach space structure on 1, and that the following inequality holds:

More generally, by Hölder's inequality, it follows that if , then  as well, and the analogous inequality holds

where  is the  norm on the interval . Thus we have a bounded linear operator . Furthermore,  in the  sense as  along the real axis. That is

for all .

The operator  is well-defined on the set of locally integrable function on the whole real line . It defines a bounded transformation on any of the Banach spaces of functions of exponential type  consisting of locally integrable functions for which the norm

is finite. For , the Laplace transform of  takes the particularly simple form

Fractional derivatives

where  denotes the ceiling function. One also obtains a differintegral interpolating between differentiation and integration by defining

An alternative fractional derivative was introduced by Caputo in 1967, and produces a derivative that has different properties: it produces zero from constant functions and, more importantly, the initial value terms of the Laplace Transform are expressed by means of the values of that function and of its derivative of integer order rather than the derivatives of fractional order as in the Riemann–Liouville derivative. The Caputo fractional derivative with base point , is then:

Another representation is:

Fractional derivative of a basic power function

Let us assume that  is a monomial of the form

The first derivative is as usual

Repeating this gives the more general result that

which, after replacing the factorials with the gamma function, leads to

To demonstrate that this is, in fact, the "half derivative" (where ), we repeat the process to get:

(because  and ) which is indeed the expected result of

For negative integer power , 1/ is 0, so it is convenient to use the following relation:

This extension of the above differential operator need not be constrained only to real powers; it also applies for complex powers. For example, the -th derivative of the -th derivative yields the second derivative. Also setting negative values for  yields integrals.

For arbitrary , since the gamma function is infinite for negative (real) integers, it is necessary to apply the fractional derivative after the integer derivative has been performed. For example,

Laplace transform

We can also come at the question via the Laplace transform. Knowing that

and

and so on, we assert
.

For example,

as expected. Indeed, given the convolution rule

and shorthanding  for clarity, we find that

which is what Cauchy gave us above.

Laplace transforms "work" on relatively few functions, but they are often useful for solving fractional differential equations.

Notes

References
.
.
.
.

.
.

External links

Bernhard Riemann
Fractional calculus
Integral transforms